Gasthaus Sonne or Haus zur Sonne is a historic restaurant in Winterthur,  canton of Zurich, Switzerland, first written record about it is from 1483. 

The building is one of the oldest inns in the city and is classified as a cultural asset of regional importance.

The Gasthaus zur Sonne already existed in the Middle Ages and was rebuilt in 1557.  The three-part staff window, which is still visible on the first floor, and the hall-like large dining room behind it, with a wooden beam ceiling, are probably from this period. In 1670, the owner of the hotel took extensive structural changes. In 1800 the building passed into the possession of the Ziegler family, who sold it to the consumer association in 1875. It set up its headquarters in the building and operated a shop on the ground floor that sold seafish from 1907, a cheap alternative to the then comparatively expensive meat. From 1925 to 1975 a cooperative bookshop was run on the ground floor.

The Winterthur Mittelschulverbindung Vitodurania, founded in 1863, used the «Sonne» since 1892 as the headquarters. The Altherrenverband of this connection founded the association Vito-Haus to the sun in 1999, who bought the building in the same year and has managed since then.

See also 
List of oldest companies

References 

Article contains translated text from Haus zur Sonne (Winterthur) on German Wikipedia retrieved on 25 February 2017.

External links 
Homepage in German
Location on Google Maps

Hotels in Switzerland
Restaurants in Switzerland
Companies established in the 15th century
15th-century establishments in Switzerland
Winterthur
1483 establishments in Europe